Micheál "Haulie" O'Sullivan (born 11 March 1977) is an Irish retired Gaelic footballer who played as a midfielder for the Cork senior team.

Born in Rosscarbery, County Cork, O'Sullivan first played competitive Gaelic football whilst at school at Mount St. Michael Secondary School. He arrived on the inter-county scene at the age of sixteen when he first linked up with the Cork minor team, before later lining out with the under-21 side. He made his senior debut in the 1998-99 National Football League. O'Sullivan went on to play a key role for the team over the next six years, winning one Munster medal and one National Football League medal. He was an All-Ireland runner-up on one occasion.

At club level O'Sullivan is an All-Ireland medallist in the intermediate grade with Carbery Rangers. He has also won one Munster and one championship medal in the intermediate grade, as well as one Munster medal and one championship medal in the junior grade. At senior level O'Sullivan has won one championship medal with divisional side Carbery.

Throughout his career O'Sullivan made 16 championship appearances for Cork. He retired from inter-county football following the conclusion of the 2004 championship.

In retirement from play O'Sullivan has become involved in coaching and team management. He is the current manager of club side Carbery Rangers, while he is also heavily involved in coaching at Clonakilty Community College.

Honours

University of Limerick
Limerick Senior Football Championship: 1998

Carbery Rangers
All-Ireland Intermediate Club Football Championship: 2005
Munster Intermediate Club Football Championship: 2004
Cork Intermediate Football Championship: 2005 (c)
Munster Junior Club Football Championship: 2003
Cork Junior Football Championship: 2003
South West Junior A Football Championship: 1998, 2003

Carbery 
Cork Senior Football Championship: 2004 (c)

Cork
Munster Senior Football Championship: 1999, 2002
National Football League: 1998–99

References

1977 births
Living people
Carbery Rangers Gaelic footballers
Carbery Gaelic footballers
Cork inter-county Gaelic footballers
Gaelic football coaches
Gaelic football managers
People from Rosscarbery